The following is a list of Pastor Greg episodes.

Specials

Season 1

Season 2

Lists of sitcom episodes